Eric James Helfand (born March 25, 1969) is an American former Major League Baseball catcher. He was later signed to a minor league contract by the Cleveland Indians after the 1995 season, and was eventually signed to another minor league contract to the Anaheim Angels in 1998 and participated in spring training.

He was born in Erie, Pennsylvania, and attended Patrick Henry High School in San Diego, California, University of Nebraska at Lincoln in Lincoln, Nebraska, and Arizona State University in Tempe, Arizona. He is Jewish, and appeared in a 2003 Jewish Sports Review of All Time Jewish Major Leaguers.

References

External links

1969 births
Living people
Baseball players from Pennsylvania
Jewish American baseball players
Jewish Major League Baseball players
Major League Baseball catchers
Oakland Athletics players
People from Erie, Pennsylvania
Nebraska Cornhuskers baseball players
Arizona State Sun Devils baseball players
American expatriate baseball players in Canada
Buffalo Bisons (minor league) players
Huntsville Stars players
Las Vegas Stars (baseball) players
Modesto A's players
Southern Oregon A's players
Tacoma Tigers players
Vancouver Canadians players
21st-century American Jews
Alaska Goldpanners of Fairbanks players